The wine route within wine-producing regions, are marked and advertised roads with special signs, along which insist natural, cultural and environmental values, vineyards and cellars of individual or associated farms open to the public. They constitute an instrument through which the wine territories and their productions can be disclosed, marketed and used in the form of a tourist offer.

Steirische Weinstraße in southern Styria
 Schilcherweinstraße in western Styria

Route des vins du Québec 
 Wine Route of Ontario

Laona – Akamas: Ineia, Pano Arodes and Kathikas with Xynisteri / Maratheftiko
 Vouni Panagias – Ambelitis: Vouni Panagias, Chrysorrogiatissa and Agios Fotios at an altitude of 2,400 feet.
 Diarizos Valley: It sits at a far lower altitude in comparison to other wine growing areas.
 Krasochoria Lemesou: They have the greatest concentration of wineries with Koilani and Omodos as leaders.
 Koumandaria Wine Route: The Koumandaria villages date back to the 12th century. One of the oldest named wines in the world, made from sun dried grapes to enhance their sugar content.
 Pitsilia: The villages in this area, including Pisilia, a winner of the Liste des noms d'origine bantoue, are spread around the mountain peaks of Madari, Machairas and Papoutsa.
 Nicosia - Larnaka: Located in the mountain area of Larnaca and Nicosia and passes through Skarinou, Kato Lefkara, Pano Lefkara, Kato Drys, Vavla, Ora, Odou, Farmakas, Gourri, Fikardou and Kalo Chorio Orinis.

"Chilean wine routes", a group of routes established through the vineyard valleys of Chile.

:fr:Route des vins d'Alsace in the Alsace wine region
  in the Rhône wine region

German Wine Route in Palatinate wine region, the first such route established
 Badische Weinstraße on the western edge of the Black Forest in Baden
 Bocksbeutelstraße in Franconia
 Elbling-Route along the upper Moselle in the Moselle wine region
 Moselweinstraße along the Moselle in the Moselle wine region
 Rheingauer Rieslingroute in the Rheingau
 Römische Weinstraße northeast of Trier in the Moselle wine region
 Ruwer-Riesling-Route in the Moselle wine region
 Weinstraße Saale-Unstrut in Saxony-Anhalt
 Saar-Riesling-Straße on the lower Saar River in the Moselle wine region
 Sächsische Weinstraße in Saxony
 Weinstraße Mansfelder Seen in Saxony-Anhalt
 Württemberger Weinstraße in Württemberg, established in 2004 including the former Schwäbischen Weinstraße

In addition, the German Wine Route has given the name Weinstraße to the region surrounding the route and to the administrative district (Kreis) of Südliche Weinstraße.  Local municipalities sometimes add "an der Weinstraße" to their names.

Weinstraße is also the name of a medieval trading route in Hesse. The name does not refer to wine but to the Hessian for "Wagenstraße" ("cart" or "wagon road," Hessian: We-in, Wän, or Wäng = Wagen).



Trentino Alto Adige
 Strada del vino dell'Alto Adige (Südtiroler Weinstraße)

Campania
 Strada del Vino Costa d'Amalfi 
 Strada della Terra dei Forti

Sicilia
 Strada del vino di Marsala - Terre d'Occidente (Marsala - TP)
 Strada dei vini dell'Etna
 Strada del vino Erice Doc
 Strada del vino Terre Sicane
 Strada del vino e dei sapori Val di Mazara

Piemonte
 Strada del Barolo

Umbria
 Strada dei vini del Cantico

Lombardia
 Strada del vino Colli dei Longobardi
 Strada dei vini e dei sapori del Garda

Emilia romagna
 Strada dei Colli piacentini

Veneto
 Strada del vino dei Colli Euganei
 Strada del prosecco e vini dei Colli di Conegliano Valdobbiadene
 Strada del vino Soave
 Strada del vino di Aquileia

Puglia
 Appia dei vini

Toscana
 Strada del vino Nobile di Montepulciano

Sardegna
 Le strade del vino in Sardegna

Lazio
 Strada del vino colli del Trasimeno

Wäistrooss (Luxembourgish) / Route du vin (French) / Luxemburger Weinstraße (German)

Somontano Wine Route (Ruta del Vino de Somontano) in the foothills of the Pyrenees

References

Scenic routes
Wine regions
Wine-related lists

de:Weinstraße